

The IAR-817 was a Romanian multipurpose aircraft built in the 1950s.

Design and construction
In 1955, a prototype of a new utility aircraft, the IAR-817, was first flown at the URMV-3 works at Brașov. The URMV-3 works had been formed at the Sovromtractor tractor factory, itself on the site of the Industria Aeronautică Română aircraft works. It was a single-engine high-wing monoplane with a pod-and-boom type fuselage of welded steel tube construction and fabric-covered wooden wings. It had a fixed tricycle undercarriage. The aircraft was powered by a single  Walter Minor 6-III air-cooled six-cylinder inverted inline engine.

An air-ambulance version of the IAR-817, the IAR-817S, entered production in 1957, with over 60 built. The type formed the basis of the IAR-818, built from 1961.

Specifications

References

 
 

817